State Route 154 (SR 154) is part of Maine's system of numbered state highways, located in Somerset and Piscataquis counties.

Junction list

References

External links

Floodgap Roadgap's RoadsAroundME: Maine State Route 154

154
Transportation in Somerset County, Maine
Transportation in Piscataquis County, Maine